Ohio's at-large congressional district existed from 1803 to 1813, from 1913 to 1915, from 1933 to 1953 and from 1963 until 1967, when it was banned by the Voting Rights Act of 1965.

From statehood in 1803 until the 1813 redistricting following the 1810 census, Ohio had only one member of the United States House of Representatives: Jeremiah Morrow.

List of members representing the district 

After the 1810 census, the at-large seat was eliminated. It was reinstated after the 1910 census.

From the 1930 census to the 1940 census, there were two seats elected at-large, on a general ticket.

In 1953, the seat was eliminated. It was restored in 1963.

In 1967, the at-large district was eliminated, and Ohio's 24th congressional district was created to replace it.

Recent election results
The following chart shows historic election results. Bold type indicates victor. Italic type indicates incumbent.

Notes

References

 Congressional Biographical Directory of the United States 1774–present
 

At-large
Former congressional districts of the United States
At-large United States congressional districts
Constituencies established in 1803
1803 establishments in Ohio
Constituencies disestablished in 1813
1813 disestablishments in Ohio
Constituencies established in 1913
1913 establishments in Ohio
Constituencies disestablished in 1915
1915 disestablishments in Ohio
Constituencies established in 1933
1933 establishments in Ohio
Constituencies disestablished in 1953
1953 disestablishments in Ohio
Constituencies established in 1963
1963 establishments in Ohio
Constituencies disestablished in 1967
1967 disestablishments in Ohio